This is a list of Taiwanese / Chinese Taipei football (soccer) players. Most players listed in this page have played for Taiwan national football team. 

* Spellings of some player names have yet been verified or confirmed.

C

F

H

J

K

L

P

T

W

X

Y

See also
 Taiwan national football team
 Taiwanese football clubs

References
List of Taiwan national team players

 
Taiwan
Footballers
Association football player non-biographical articles